Stephen Douglas Clark (May 15, 1916 – January 5, 1997) was a Canadian politician. He served in the Legislative Assembly of New Brunswick as member of the Liberal party from 1948 to 1952.

References

1916 births
1997 deaths
21st-century Canadian politicians
New Brunswick Liberal Association MLAs
Politicians from Saint John, New Brunswick